Bairagi Brahmin  is a Hindu caste. They are also called by different names that are Swami, Bairagi, Mahant, Vaishnav, Vairagi, Ramanandi, Shami, Vaishnav , Pujari. They are Vaishnav, and wear the sacred thread. Bairagi caste is one from the high castes of Bengal – Brahmin, Rajput, Chatri, Grahacarya , Vaidya. 

Bairagi Brahmin belong to the Brahamin varna. Senugupta describes them as a High caste group. William Pinch believes that the Bairagi branch of Vaishnavas is the result of the Galta conference of 17th Century.

According to Mayer, the Bairagis were one of a few sectarian castes which accepted admissions from higher castes. He states that they Bairagis had a worldly and celibate branches of the caste. He states they were considered of equal status with Brahmins, Rajputs, and Jat.

Dynasties

Nandgaon
The first ruler Mahant Ghasi Das of Nandgaon State, was recognized as a feudal chief by the British government in 1865 and was granted a sanad of adoption. Later the British conferred the title of raja on the ruling mahant.

Chhuikhadan
The chiefs of Chhuikhadan State were originally under the Bhonsles of Nagpur, the first Chief being Mahant Rup Das in 1750. However, after defeat of Marathas, they were recognized by British as feudatory chiefs in 1865 conferring the title and sanad to Mahant Laxman Das.

Akharas
There are three prominent Bairagi (Vaishnav) Akharas:
 Digambar Akhara
 Nirmohi Akhara
 Nirvani Akhara

Mahabharat
The Mahabharata says that once, after Babruvahana dug a dry pond, a Bairagi Brahmin reached the centre of pond and instantly water came out of the pond with a thunderous noise.

References

Indian castes
Brahmin communities of Bihar
Brahmin communities of Delhi
Brahmin communities of Uttar Pradesh